Schnecken are a type of sweet bun or roll of German origin.
Today schnecken can be commonly found in Germany, Austria, Switzerland, France, Israel, southern Brazil and the USA.

The name Schnecken means snails in German and refers to the shape of the pastry.  The bun is still common in Germany and Austria (in some regions as Schneckennudel), where the name is Schnecke (which is the German singular of Schnecken), and in other parts of northern Europe.  They are more commonly known as escargots (snails) or pain au raisin in France. Popular variants are Nussschnecken (filled with nuts and often raisins as well), Mohnschnecken (with a poppyseed filling) and Zimtschnecken, which are quite similar to cinnamon rolls.

References

Sweet breads
German cuisine